Levitation were an English rock band fronted by ex-House of Love guitarist Terry Bickers. Levitation's music and attitude challenged an early 1990s UK alternative music scene dominated by shoegazing and Madchester.

Albums

Extended plays

Singles

Radio sessions
 Radio 5, "The Mix" 10 June 1991, "Against Nature", "Firefly", "Rosemary Jones", "Bedlam".
 Radio 1, Mark Goodier's Evening Session May 1992 "Resist", "Pieces of Mary", "Evergreen", "Hangnail"
 Radio 1, Mark Goodier's Evening Session July 1992 "Sacred Lover", "Hieronymous Bop" (Terry and Bob playing acoustically).

References

Alternative rock discographies